(the marine, in Spanish) was a Chilean daily newspaper, based in Pichilemu, Cardenal Caro province. It was founded on 14 January 1917 by newspaper editor , and circulated between January and March 1917.

During its publication,  attempted to convince authorities to provide drinking water to the commune of Pichilemu, and once suggested it to be extracted from a local lake, . It also documented the visits of prominent Chilean doctors, including Carlos Charlín Correa, who would later become the rector of the University of Chile in 1927. The newspaper also documented the plans of President Juan Luis Sanfuentes to visit Pichilemu.

Background

He was the fourth of seven children; in order of birth date, Alejandro, Arturo, Abrahám, Aliro, Abel, and Ambrosina. His father was the owner of a farm in Roma, San Fernando, and several houses in that city and Pichilemu. Ramírez Olivares married Rosa Camilo Ugarte on 8 September 1885, in the city of San Fernando. The couple had four children: Augusto (who would later go on to become the Chilean Viceconsul to El Salvador), Rosa, Eva and Miguel.

He founded several newspapers in the province of Colchagua, during the early 20th century.

In early 1908, Ramírez founded the first newspaper of Pichilemu, which he named , and whose first edition appeared on 16 January 1908.  was originally announced as a biweekly ("published on Thursdays and Sundays"), regionalist newspaper, with editor  stating in an article named  (Our word) that "today [16 January 1908] we comply with our promise to create this journalistic paper, absolute and exclusive organ to the regional interests of Colchagua, especially [those] of the port of Pichilemu." Ramírez also stated that "against general customs in all new publications, we are not making here a description of our program of work: facts will prove our participation in the struggle for progress."

 published poems, a scientific section by collaborator physician Rodríguez Aguirre, and sections of obituaries, chronicles, social life, and sensationalist articles,. However, it only survived until March 1908, and just two editions of the newspaper are preserved in the National Library of Chile; at least three editions were published.

After abandoning El Puerto, Ramírez continued to publish La Provincia in San Fernando and, in later years, published El Progreso in Chimbarongo, between February and December 1916, before founding El Marino in Pichilemu.

History

 first appeared in Pichilemu on 14 January 1917. In an article named  ("Our first word"), Ramírez wrote that the newspaper was published "with the purpose of fulfilling a local necessity of the [summer] season", adding that "the resort of Pichilemu already needs a bulletin to serve as the bond of the thoughts of tourists who favor this beach with their presence".  was printed in a press owned by Ramírez, located in Pichilemu, with paper of "very modest" quality. In  third edition, published on 21 January 1917, editor  wrote that, although he thought the newspaper would be a "failure", it was instead "favored with the applause (support) of distinguished people".

Among the people mentioned in the  section were doctors Eugenio Díaz Lira, Gregorio Amunátegui, Carlos Charlín Correa (also the rector of the University of Chile in 1927), senator Ismael Valdés Valdés, and deputy Jorge Errázuriz Tagle. It also documented the plans of President Juan Luis Sanfuentes to visit Pichilemu.

"These things of public interest, in favor of the salubrity of a town with such  a great future, need the dispassionate attention of the public powers", said an article written on the topic.

Despite its popularity,  ceased its publications on 15 March 1917. An article titled  ("End of the journey") stated that "we are going out with the satisfaction of having obtained a greater result than we expected", adding that "Pichilemu needs the campaign in favor of the drinking water to be continued". Despite  announced it would return on the next summer season, in 1918, it did not appear again in print format. In fact, no other newspapers were published in Pichilemu until January 1944, when Pichilemu was founded by future Mayor Carlos Rojas Pavez, writer José Arraño Acevedo and municipal secretary Miguel Larravide Blanco.

See also 
 El Puerto (predecessor of )

Notes

References

External links

1917 establishments in Chile
1917 disestablishments in Chile
Defunct newspapers published in Chile
Mass media in Pichilemu
Newspapers published in Chile
Publications established in 1917
Publications disestablished in 1917
Spanish-language newspapers